Admiralty Island or Admiralty Islands may refer to:

 Admiralty Island, an island in the Alexander Archipelago of Alaska, US
 Admiralty Islands, a group of 18 islands in the Bismarck Archipelago of Papua New Guinea
 New Holland Island, an artificial island also known as "Admiralty Island" in St. Petersburg, Russian Federation 
 Qikiqtagafaaluk, the traditional name for Admiralty Island, an Arctic island south of Victoria Island in Nunavut, Canada
 The Admiralty Islands (Ontario), a group of islands in the Saint Lawrence River in Ontario, Canada

See also
 Admiralty Group, also Admiralty Islands, a group of eight named rocky outcrops north of Lord Howe Island, New South Wales, Australia
 
 Admiralty (disambiguation)
 Admiral (disambiguation)